Luis Alberto Lazarte (born March 4, 1971, in Mar del Plata, Buenos Aires, Argentina) is an Argentinean former professional boxer who has held the IBF junior flyweight title from May 2010 until April 2011.

Professional career
He won the IBF junior flyweight title from Colombian Carlos Támara on May 29, 2010. Lazarte was the oldest reigning world boxing champion in the world, at 40 years old, until May 21, 2011. He lost his title by decision to former champion Ulises Solis on May 21, 2011. Lazarte also challenged for the world title twice at minimumweight (against Kermin Guardia and Daniel Reyes), twice more at light flyweight (against Édgar Sosa and John Riel Casimero) and twice at flyweight (against Pongsaklek Wonjongkam and Omar Narváez).

Lazarte's competitive boxing career effectively ended after he was given a rare lifetime ban by the International Boxing Federation following a February 10, 2012 match against Johnriel Casimero in which Lazarte, surrounded by supporters and fighting in his home country, intentionally leveled low blows, headbutts and illegal blows to the back of the head against Casimero, as well as biting him at least twice, threatened the referee's life after being warned for his conduct, then (after being ruled the loser) deliberately sparked a riot in the arena that caused numerous additional injuries to police, spectators and Casimero's team.

In February 2012, during an IBF Light Flyweight title fight in Mar del Plata, Argentina, Lazarte was stopped in the tenth round by Johnriel Casimero . After the fight Lazarte and his team sparked a riot in which Casimero and his team were attacked. They were later escorted  by  pólice and later Lazarte visited and apologized to Casimero. The Philippines has filed a diplomatic protest to the Argentine government after Argentine fans attacked Casimero in the ring after winning the title bout.[2][3]
Philippine Foreign Affairs spokesman Raul Hernandez said that his country's embassy filed a protest with Argentina's Ministry of Foreign Affairs and is awaiting an explanation.[2]
His role in the riot resulted in a rare lifetime ban being given to Lazarte by the IBF. He announced his retirement afterwards but returned in 2014 for four extra, non IBF-sanctioned bouts.

Professional boxing record

See also
List of light-flyweight boxing champions
Boxing at the 1995 Pan American Games

References

External links

1971 births
Living people
Mini-flyweight boxers
Light-flyweight boxers
Flyweight boxers
Super-flyweight boxers
World light-flyweight boxing champions
International Boxing Federation champions
Argentine male boxers
Sportspeople from Mar del Plata